The Nine Unknown is a 1923  novel by Talbot Mundy. Originally serialised in Adventure
magazine, it concerns the Nine Unknown Men, a secret society founded to preserve and develop knowledge that would be dangerous to humanity if it fell into the wrong hands. The nine unknown men were entrusted with guarding nine books of secret knowledge.

Plot 

In the novel the nine men are the embodiment of good and face up against nine Kali worshippers, who sow confusion and masquerade as the true sages. The story surrounds a priest called Father Cyprian who is seeking possession of the books but who wants to destroy them out of Christian piety, and a number of other characters who are interested in learning their contents.

Influence
The concept of the "Nine Unknown Men" was further popularized by Louis Pauwels and Jacques Bergier in their 1960 book The Morning of the Magicians. They claimed that the Nine Unknown were real and had been founded by the Mauryan Emperor Ashoka around 270 BC. They also claimed that Pope Silvester II had met the Nine Unknown, and that nineteenth-century French colonial administrator and writer Louis Jacolliot insisted on their existence.

In popular culture
 In the first edition of Anton LaVey's Satanic Bible (1969), The Nine Unknown were the final dedicatees mentioned in the dedication.
 The "Nine Unknown" have since been the subject of the several novels including Shadow Tyrants by Clive Cussler and Boyd Morrison; The Mahabharata Secret, a 2013 novel by Christopher C. Doyle; Finders, Keepers, a 2015 novel by Sapan Saxena; and Shobha Nihalani's Nine novel trilogy.
 The American television series Heroes prominently features the number nine, and the writers and producers Aron Coliete and Joe Pakaski have credited the story of Ashoka and The Nine Unknown Men as one of the many influences for the series and as a clue to the mystery surrounding the number.
 JL50 is a Hindi-language sci-fi web series launched in September 2020 on Sony Liv. The series centers around the Nine Unknown and the books they preserved. It relates that these books contain knowledge of political power, the origin of martial arts, communication with extra-terrestrial species, and time travel. The series mentions Project A (for Ashoka) which involves time travel.
 On 27 August 2020,Reflector Entertainment announced a video game UNKNOWN 9 presenting the story of the secret society formed by Ashoka to be published by Bandai Namco Entertainment for PC and next generation consoles.

See also 
Ascended master
Eight Immortals
Illuminati
Navaratnas
Seven Brahmarshi
Vaimanika Shastra
Emperor Ashoka

References

Further reading

External links 
A Short Film based on Nine Unknown Men
HTML text at Gutenberg Australia

The Nine Unknown Men of Ashoka
Legend of the Nine Unknown Men

Conspiracy theories
Works originally published in Adventure (magazine)
Novels first published in serial form
Memorials to Ashoka
Cultural depictions of Ashoka